Iranian alternative rock is a subgenre of Iranian rock. This style was inspired by the alternative rock works of American musicians. This style was formed at the end of Iran-Iraq war in Tehran to defuse the pressure of war.

History 
After the Iranian Revolution, rock music became illegal. After Iran-Iraq War, the youth needed some music to protest. In the following years, groups such as Kiosk, Ahoora and O-Hum provided important effects in this style. "Jurassic Park Coalition" is the best-known alternative rock Iranian song released by Kiosk Group. Alternative rock music is not yet recognized in Iran, so the groups that work in this genre continue to operate underground.

List of artists 

Kiosk
 O-Hum
 Ahoora
 127
 Take It Easy Hospital
 Ali Azimi
 Barad
 Antikarisma

References 

Alternative rock genres
Alternative